Gogo Chu Nzeribe was a Nigerian trade unionist and a leader of the nation's communist movement during the drive towards independence in the 1950s. He was the secretary general of the Trade Union Congress of Nigeria, which at the time was led by president Michael Imoudu. Nzeribe was murdered in 1967 by troops loyal to the federal side during the crisis of the 1960s. Prior to his death, he was arrested and detained at Dodan Barracks by the Yakubu Gowon regime. 

He had a daughter with Nigerian novelist, Flora Nwapa.

Early life
Nzeribe was born into a well-to-do family and attended King's College, Lagos. He turned to trade unionism as a result his interest in Nigeria's struggle for independence. He started out organizing student and workers rallies against the colonial regime.

References

Nigerian activists
Igbo activists
1967 deaths
Year of birth unknown
Nigerian trade unionists
King's College, Lagos alumni